In mathematics, a Dold manifold is one of the manifolds , where  is the involution that acts as −1 on the m-sphere  and as complex conjugation on the complex projective space .

References

Algebraic topology
Manifolds